is a railway station on Kintetsu Kashihara Line in Yamatokōriyama, Nara, Japan.

Lines 
 Kintetsu Railway
 Kashihara Line

Platforms and tracks

History
 July 1, 1979—Family-Kōemmae Station was opened.

External links
 

Railway stations in Nara Prefecture
Railway stations in Japan opened in 1979